This is a list of butterflies in the country of Italy.

Hesperiidae – skippers
Subfamily Hesperiinae
Dingy swift, Gegenes nostrodamus 
Dark Hottentot, Gegenes pumilio 
Silver-spotted skipper, Hesperia comma 
Large skipper, Ochlodes sylvanuss 

Subfamily Pyrginae
Mallow skipper, Carcharodus alceae 
Southern marbled skipper, Carcharodus baeticus 
Tufted skipper, Carcharodus floccifera 
Marbled skipper, Carcharodus lavatherae 
Dingy skipper, Erynnis tages 
Sage skipper, Muschampia proto 
Large grizzled skipper, Pyrgus alveus 
Alpine grizzled skipper, Pyrgus andromedae 
Oberthür's grizzled skipper, Pyrgus armoricanus 
Foulquier's grizzled skipper, Pyrgus bellieri bellieri 
Pyrgus bellieri picenus 
Dusky grizzled skipper, Pyrgus cacaliae 
Carline skipper, Pyrgus carlinae 
Safflower skipper, Pyrgus carthami 
Cinquefoil skipper, Pyrgus cirsii 
Southern grizzled skipper, Pyrgus malvoides 
Grizzled skipper, Pyrgus malvae 
Rosy grizzled skipper, Pyrgus onopordi 
Olive skipper, Pyrgus serratulae 
Yellow-banded skipper, Pyrgus sidae 
Warren's skipper, Pyrgus warrenensis 
Lulworth skipper, Thymelicus acteon 
Essex skipper, Thymelicus lineola 
Red-underwing skipper, Thymelicus sylvestris 

Subfamily Heteropterinae
Arctic skipper, Carterocephalus palaemon 
Large chequered skipper, Heteropterus morpheus

Papilionidae - swallowtails
Scarce swallowtail, Iphiclides podalirius 
Alexanor, Papilio alexanor 
Old World swallowtail, Papilio machaon 
Corsican swallowtail, Papilio hospiton 
Mountain Apollo, Parnassius apollo 
Clouded Apollo, Parnassius mnemosyne 
Phoebus Apollo, Parnassius phoebus phoebus  
Parnassius phoebus sacerdos 
Southern festoon, Zerynthia polyxena

Pieridae – whites
Subfamily Dismorphiinae
Wood white, Leptidea sinapis 
Réal's wood white, Leptidea reali 

Subfamily Coliadinae
Berger's clouded yellow, Colias alfacariensis 
Clouded yellow, Colias croceus 
Pale clouded yellow, Colias hyale 
Pale Arctic clouded yellow, Colias palaeno 
Mountain clouded yellow, Colias phicomone 

Subfamily Pierinae
Orange tip, Anthocharis cardamines 
Eastern orange tip, Anthocharis damone 
Provence orange tip, Anthocharis euphenoides 
Black-veined white, Aporia crataegi 
Eastern dappled white, Euchloe ausonia 
Western dappled white, Euchloe crameri 
Portuguese dappled white, Euchloe tagis 
Cleopatra, Gonepteryx cleopatra 
Common brimstone, Gonepteryx rhamni 
Large white, Pieris brassicae 
Dark-veined white, Pieris bryoniae 
Mountain small white, Pieris ergane 
Southern small white, Pieris mannii 
Green-veined white, Pieris napi 
Small white, Pieris rapae 
Lofty Bath white, Pontia callidice 
Bath white, Pontia daplidice 
Eastern Bath white, Pontia edusa

Riodinidae
Duke of Burgundy, Hamearis lucina

Lycaenidae – blues, coppers and hairstreaks
Subfamily Theclinae
Brown hairstreak, Thecla betulae 
Green hairstreak, Callophrys rubi 
Purple hairstreak, Neozephyrus quercus 
Sloe hairstreak, Satyrium acaciae 
False ilex hairstreak, Satyrium esculi 
Ilex hairstreak, Satyrium ilicis 
Satyrium pruni, Satyrium pruni 
Blue spot hairstreak, Satyrium spini 
White-letter hairstreak, Satyrium w-album 

Subfamily Lycaeninae
Purple-shot copper, Lycaena alciphron 
Large copper, Lycaena dispar 
Purple-edged copper, Lycaena hippothoe 
Small copper, Lycaena phlaeas 
Lesser fiery copper, Lycaena thersamon 
Sooty copper, Lycaena tityrus 
Lycaena subalpina 
Scarce copper, Lycaena virgaureae 

Subfamily Polyommatinae
Peablue, Lampides boeticus 
Lang's short-tailed blue, Leptotes pirithous 
Small blue, Cupido (Cupido) minimus 
Osiris blue, Cupido (Cupido) osiris 
Provençal short-tailed blue, Cupido (Everes) alcetas 
Short-tailed blue, Cupido (Everes) argiades 
Holly blue, Celastrina argiolus 
Green-underside blue, Glaucopsyche (Glaucopsyche) alexis 
Black-eyed blue, Glaucopsyche (Glaucopsyche) melanops 
Iolas blue, Iolana iolas 
Alcon blue, Phengaris alcon 
Large blue, Phengaris arion 
Scarce large blue, Phengaris teleius 
Mountain Alcon blue, Phengaris rebeli 
Baton blue, Pseudophilotes baton 
Chequered blue, Pseudophilotes vicrama schiffermuelleri 
Pseudophilotes barbagiae 
Chequered blue butterfly, Scolitantides orion 
Brown argus, Aricia agestis, 
Northern brown argus, Aricia allous  
Southern brown argus, Aricia cramera  
Silvery argus, Aricia nicias 
Geranium argus, Eumedonia eumedon 
Arctic blue, Agriades glandon 
Alpine argus, Agriades orbitulus 
Cranberry blue, Agriades optilete 
Silver-studded blue, Plebejus argus 
Reverdin's blue, Plebejus argyrognomon 
Idas blue, Plebejus idas 
Alpine zephyr blue, Kretania trappi 
Mazarine blue, Cyaniris semiargus 
Damon blue, Polyommatus damon 
Furry blue, Polyommatus (Agrodiaetus) dolus dolus 
Polyommatus (Agrodiaetus) dolus virgilia 
Piedmont anomalous blue, Polyommatus (Agrodiaetus) humedasae 
Ripart's anomalous blue, Polyommatus (Agrodiaetus) ripartii ripartii 
Meleager's blue, Polyommatus (Meleageria) daphnis 
Amanda's blue, Polyommatus (Polyommatus) amandus 
Turquoise blue, Polyommatus (Polyommatus) dorylas 
Eros blue, Polyommatus (Polyommatus) eros eros 
Escher's blue, Polyommatus (Polyommatus) escheri 
Common blue, Polyommatus (Polyommatus) icarus 
Polyommatus (Polyommatus) celina 
Chapman's blue, Polyommatus (Polyommatus) thersites 
Adonis blue, Lysandra bellargus 
Chalkhill blue, Lysandra coridon coridon 
Provence chalk hill blue, Lysandra hispana

Nymphalidae – fritillaries and others
Subfamily Nymphalinae
European peacock, Aglais io 
Small tortoiseshell, Aglais urticae 
Map butterfly, Araschnia levana 
White petticoat, Nymphalis antiopa 
Large tortoiseshell, Nymphalis polychloros 
Comma, Polygonia c-album 
Southern comma, Polygonia egea 
Red admiral, Vanessa atalanta 
Painted lady, Vanessa cardui 
Cynthia's fritillary, Euphydryas cynthia 
Scarce fritillary, Euphydryas maturna 
Marsh fritillary, Euphydryas aurinia 
Asian fritillary, Euphydryas intermedia 
Aetherie fritillary, Melitaea aetherie 
Little fritillary, Melitaea asteria 
Heath fritillary, Melitaea athalia 
Nickerl's fritillary, Melitaea aurelia 
Assman's fritillary, Melitaea britomartis 
Glanville fritillary, Melitaea cinxia 
Provençal fritillary, Melitaea deione 
False heath fritillary, Melitaea diamina 
Spotted fritillary, Melitaea didyma 
Melitaea nevadensis 
Meadow fritillary, Melitaea parthenoides 
Knapweed fritillary, Melitaea phoebe 
Jerusalem fritillary, Melitaea telona 
Lesser spotted fritillary, Melitaea trivia 
Grisons fritillary, Melitaea varia 

Subfamily Heliconiinae
Silver-washed fritillary, Argynnis paphia 
Cardinal, Argynnis pandora 
High brown fritillary, Fabriciana adippe 
Niobe fritillary, Fabriciana niobe 
Dark green fritillary, Speyeria aglaja 
Balkan fritillary, Boloria (Boloria) graeca 
Mountain fritillary, Boloria (Boloria) napaea 
Shepherd's fritillary, Boloria (Boloria) pales 
Violet fritillary, Boloria (Clossiana) dia 
Pearl-bordered fritillary, Boloria (Clossiana) euphrosyne 
Small pearl-bordered fritillary, Boloria (Clossiana) selene 
Thor's fritillary, Boloria (Clossiana) thore 
Purple bog fritillary, Boloria (Clossiana) titania 
Ocellate bog fritillary, Boloria (Proclossiana) eunomia 
Marbled fritillary, Brenthis daphne 
Twin-spot fritillary, Brenthis hecate 
Lesser marbled fritillary, Brenthis ino 
Queen of Spain, Issoria lathonia 

Subfamily Charaxinae
Two-tailed pasha, Charaxes jasius 

Subfamily Danainae
Plain tiger, Danaus (Anosia) chrysippus 

Subfamily Apaturinae
Lesser purple emperor, Apatura ilia 
Purple emperor, Apatura iris 

Subfamily Libytheinae
Nettle-tree butterfly, Libythea celtis 

Subfamily Limenitidinae
(Eurasian) white admiral, Limenitis camilla 
Poplar admiral, Limenitis populi
Southern white admiral, Limenitis reducta 
Hungarian glider, Neptis rivularis 
Pallas' sailer, Neptis sappho 

Subfamily Satyrinae
Woodland grayling, Hipparchia (Hipparchia) fagi 
Rock grayling, Hipparchia (Hipparchia) hermione hermione 
Hipparchia (Hipparchia) neomiris 
Tree grayling, Hipparchia (Neohipparchia) statilinus 
Hipparchia (Parahipparchia) neapolitana 
Hipparchia (Parahipparchia) sbordonii 
Grayling, Hipparchia (Parahipparchia) semele 
Striped grayling, Hipparchia (Pseudotergumia) fidia 
Oriental meadow brown, Hyponephele lupinus 
Dusky meadow brown, Hyponephele lycaon 
Large wall, Lasiommata maera 
Wall, Lasiommata megera 
Northern wall brown, Lasiommata petropolitana 
Woodland brown, Lopinga achine 
Meadow brown, Maniola jurtina 
Marbled white, Melanargia galathea 
Western marbled white, Melanargia occitanica 
Esper's marbled white, Melanargia russiae 
Italian marbled white, Melanargia arge 
Dryad, Minois dryas 
Ringlet, Aphantopus hyperantus 
False grayling, Arethusana arethusa 
Great banded grayling, Brintesia circe 
Alpine grayling, Oeneis (Oeneis) glacialis 
Hermit, Chazara briseis 
Pearly heath, Coenonympha arcania 
Corsican heath, Coenonympha corinna 
Coenonympha corinna elbana 
Dusky heath, Coenonympha dorus 
Alpine heath, Coenonympha gardetta gardetta 
Coenonympha gardetta darwiniana 
Chestnut heath, Coenonympha glycerion 
False ringlet, Coenonympha oedippus 
Small heath, Coenonympha pamphilus 
Eastern large heath, Coenonympha rhodopensis 
Large heath, Coenonympha tullia 
False Mnestra ringlet, Erebia aethiopellus 
Scotch argus, Erebia aethiops 
Almond-eyed ringlet, Erebia alberganus 
Lorkovic's brassy ringlet, Erebia calcaria 
Common brassy ringlet, Erebia cassioides cassioides 
Raetzer's ringlet, Erebia christi 
Small mountain ringlet, Erebia epiphron 
Eriphyle ringlet, Erebia eriphyle 
Large ringlet, Erebia euryale 
Yellow-banded ringlet, Erebia flavofasciata 
Silky ringlet, Erebia gorge 
Arran brown, Erebia ligea 
Yellow-spotted ringlet, Erebia manto 
Woodland ringlet, Erebia medusa 
Lesser mountain ringlet, Erebia melampus 
Piedmont ringlet, Erebia meolans 
Mnestra's ringlet, Erebia mnestra 
Marbled ringlet, Erebia montanus 
Autumn ringlet, Erebia neoridas 
de Lesse's brassy ringlet, Erebia nivalis 
Bright eyed ringlet, Erebia oeme 
Ottoman brassy ringlet, Erebia ottomana 
Dewy ringlet, Erebia pandrose 
Blind ringlet, Erebia pharte 
Sooty ringlet, Erebia pluto 
Water ringlet, Erebia pronoe 
Larche ringlet, Erebia scipio 
Styrian ringlet, Erebia stirius 
Stygian ringlet, Erebia styx 
de Prunner's ringlet, Erebia triarius 
Swiss brassy ringlet, Erebia tyndarus 
Speckled wood, Pararge aegeria 
Southern gatekeeper, Pyronia (Idata) cecilia 
Gatekeeper, Pyronia (Pyronia) tithonus 
Black satyr, Satyrus actaea 
Great sooty satyr, Satyrus ferula

References
Dapporto and Cini - Faunal patterns in Tuscan archipelago butterflies: The dominant influence is recent geography not paleogeography
Boriani, Burgio, Marini and Genghini Faunistic study on butterflies collected in Northern Italy rural landscape

Italy, butterflies
Butterflies
Italy
Italy
Italy